Drosera broomensis is a small, perennial carnivorous plant in the genus Drosera that is endemic to Western Australia.

Description
Its leaves are arranged in a small, leafy rosette, from which one to four inflorescences emerge. It produces white flowers in February and March. D. broomensis grows in sandy soils to the north and northeast of Broome in the Kimberley region.

Taxonomy
It was first described by Allen Lowrie in 1996, though earlier specimens from as early as 1891 had been collected. The specific epithet broomensis refers to the region in which it grows. It is closely related to Drosera petiolaris and differs from other related species by its glabrous inflorescence.

See also
List of Drosera species
Taxonomy of Drosera

References

External links

Carnivorous plants of Australia
Caryophyllales of Australia
Eudicots of Western Australia
Plants described in 1996
broomensis